Bensberg Castle is a former royal hunting lodge in Bergisch Gladbach, North Rhine-Westphalia, Germany. It is now operated as a luxury hotel under the name 'Althoff Grandhotel Schloss Bensberg'. The central axis of the building complex is exactly geared to the Cologne Cathedral.

History 
The hotel was built in the early 18th century. During the COVID-19 pandemic, association football club 1. FC Köln moved their quarantine training grounds to the site. From October 1945 to March 1946 it was the home of the 2nd Battalion Welsh Guards.

References

External links 

Hunting lodges in Germany
Bergisch Gladbach
Luxury hotels
Hotels in Germany